Mark Knowles and Daniel Nestor were the defending champions, but did not participate this year.

Petr Pála and Pavel Vízner won in the final 6–4, 3–6, [12–10], against Julian Knowle and Jürgen Melzer.

Seeds

Draw

Draw

External links
Draw

Vienna Open
2006 ATP Tour